The SVB Tweede Divisie is second-highest division overall in the Surinamese football league system after the SVB Eerste Divisie, where the top club is promoted to each season. The weakest club is relegated to the Lidbondentoernooi. The league was previously known as the SVB Eerste Klasse but became the Eerste Divisie for the 2016–17 season after Suriname's top division changed its name from Hoofdklasse to Topklasse, only to be rebranded as the Tweede Divisie for the 2017–18 season.

The competition was founded in 1956.

Clubs 

The following clubs participated in the 2022–23 season:

 Sea boys
 Happy boys
 Real Moengotapoe
 Botopasi
 Kamal De Wakers
 Juniors 2014
 Acoconut
 Tahiti 
 Sophia
 Sunny point

The following clubs have participated in the league:
 Boma Star
 De Ster
 FCS Nacional
 Fortuna 1975
 Inter Rica
 Jai Hanuman
 Notch
 Randjiet Boys
 Real Saramacca
 SNL 
 Takdier Boys
 Tammenga

References

 

2
1956 establishments in Suriname
 
Sports leagues established in 1956
Second level football leagues in the Caribbean